Cyril Theron Campion (1894–1961) was an English playwright and screenwriter. He was the father of the actor Gerald Campion.

Selected filmography
 Channel Crossing (1933)
 It's You I Want (1936)
 Debt of Honour (1936)
 Convict 99 (1938)
 Discoveries (1939)

References

Bibliography
 Landy, Marcia. British Genres: Cinema and Society, 1930-1960. Princeton University Press, 2014.

External links

1890s births
1961 deaths
English male screenwriters
People from the London Borough of Camden
20th-century English screenwriters
20th-century English male writers
English male dramatists and playwrights